RMIT University Vietnam (informally RMIT Vietnam or RMIT) is the Vietnamese branch of the Australian research university the Royal Melbourne Institute of Technology, known in Australia as RMIT University. It has three campuses located in Ho Chi Minh City, Hanoi and Danang.

RMIT was the first completely foreign-owned university granted permission to operate in Vietnam. Since its establishment in 2000, it has won 17 Golden Dragon Awards from the Vietnamese Government for excellence in education.

History 

In 1998 RMIT in Australia was invited by the Vietnamese government to establish a fully foreign-owned university in Vietnam. In 2000, it was granted a licence by the Vietnamese Ministry of Planning and Investment to deliver undergraduate and postgraduate education, training and research.

In 2001, it purchased and restored a 19th-century French Colonial building and grounds in District 3, Ho Chi Minh City. The building, located on Pham Ngoc Thach Street, is informally referred to as "the Castle" by students. The site remains a radial site of the present Ho Chi Minh City campus. In 2004, it established a second campus in Hanoi.

The present Ho Chi Minh City campus is located in the Phu My Hung area of the Saigon South development in District 7. The first academic buildings on the large purpose-built campus opened in 2005. In 2011, its recreation complex and residential centres opened.

In 2018 it opened its Foreign Language Training Centre in Danang. The centre provides English language programs.

RMIT has been awarded 17 Golden Dragon Award for its "excellence in education" by the Vietnamese Ministry of Trade since 2003. It has also been awarded by the Australian Chamber of Commerce for its "innovation and community service" as well as received Certificates of Merit from the Ho Chi Minh City People’s Committee and the Hanoi Government. In 2008, RMIT International University received a Certificate of Merit from the prime minister of Vietnam, Nguyen Tan Dung, for its "educational achievements contributing to the social and economic development of Vietnam". In 2011, RMIT University Vietnam received Certificate of Merit from Vietnam Minister of Education and Training.

Organisation 

Royal Melbourne Institute of Technology (RMIT) is a public university created by the Royal Melbourne Institute of Technology Act 1992 of the parliament of the Australian state of Victoria, and it continues in accordance with the Royal Melbourne Institute of Technology Act 2010. RMIT is governed by a Council, led by its Chancellor (as Governor-in-Council), which is responsible for the "general direction and superintendence of the University".

The University (the colleges, schools, institutes and centres of RMIT) trades under the name "RMIT University" in Australia, and its subsidiaries are managed under the name "RMIT Group". The Council grants powers of administration over RMIT University and the RMIT Group to its Vice-Chancellor and President (as chief executive officer), who is responsible for the "conduct of the University's affairs in all matters".

RMIT Vietnam Holdings Pty Ltd is the Australian subsidiary in the RMIT Group that owns the Vietnamese company RMIT University Vietnam LLC. RMIT University in Australia confers the qualifications of RMIT University Vietnam, which are subject to the requirements set out by the Australian Government Department of Education and Training (and Tertiary Education Quality and Standards Agency) and the Vietnamese Government Ministry of Education and Training.

RMIT University Vietnam is managed by a Board led by the Deputy Vice-Chancellor (Global Development) and Vice-President of RMIT University (as Chair of the Board).

Campuses

Ho Chi Minh City

Saigon South 

RMIT's Saigon South campus is located in Ho Chi Minh City (702 Nguyen Van Linh, District 7), approximately 7 km from the city centre. The purpose-built facility was opened in 2001 and was designed by architectural firm Norman Day and Associates. Professor Norman Day is an adjunct professor of architecture at RMIT University and also an alumnus of the university.

The East Wing of the campus houses its main academic centre and sporting fields, and the West Wing houses the university's administration offices, food and beverage outlets, a health clinic, the Melbourne Theatre, and the campus library.

In 2012, RMIT Vietnam opened its latest Academic Building - AB2. Stage 2, completed in 2009, included a sport and leisure centre, tennis courts, and residential buildings.

District 3 

In October 2011, RMIT opened English classes at a campus on Pham Ngoc Thach in District 3. The campus also hosts business and IELTs classes.

Hanoi 
RMIT's Hanoi campus opened in 2004 in a renovated multi-level building situated in the Van Phuc Compound in the diplomatic quarter of Hanoi.  From March 2011, RMIT Hanoi has moved from the previous nine level building near the famous Temple of Literature, Hanoi (Văn Miếu Hà Nội) to Tower B of Handi Resco Building at 521 Kim Ma Street, Ba Dinh District, Hanoi.

Programs 
The current offered programs include:

Undergraduate 
 Bachelor of Business (Economics and Finance)
 Bachelor of Business (International Business)
 Bachelor of Business (Management)
 Bachelor of Business (Logistics & Supply Chain Management)
Bachelor of Business (Digital Business) 
Bachelor of Business (Human Resource Management) 
 Bachelor of Digital Marketing
 Bachelor of Tourism & Hospitality Management
 Bachelor of Communication (Professional Communication)
 Bachelor of Design (Digital Media)
Bachelor of Digital Film and Video 
Bachelor of Design Studies
 Bachelor of Engineering (Electrical and Electronics) (Honours)
 Bachelor of Engineering (Robotics and Mechatronics) (Honours)
 Bachelor of Engineering (Software Engineering) (Honours)
 Bachelor of Information Technology
Bachelor of Applied Science (Psychology) 
 Bachelor of Fashion (Merchandise Management)
 Bachelor of Languages
Bachelor of Applied Science (Aviation)

Postgraduate 
 Master of Business Administration (MBA)
 Master of International Business
 Master of Global Trade
Graduate Certificate in Business Administration 
Graduate Certificate in International Business 
Graduate Certificate of Global Trade 
Graduate Diploma of Global Trade

Leaders 
RMIT University Vietnam is governed by a Board of Management, the Chair being Professor Peter Coloe, Acting Deputy Vice-Chancellor, Global Development.

Student life 
RMIT University Vietnam's campuses currently have a combined student population of approximately 6000 students, with international students from Australia, China, France, Germany, Malaysia, Russia, Singapore, South Africa, South Korea, the United Kingdom and the United States, as well as other countries. The percentage of international students is approximately 9%.

Across the (Hanoi and Ho Chi Minh City) campuses students have access to over 60 student clubs such as English, photography, dance, entrepreneurship, business, accountancy, Aikido, San Shou, SIFE, the environment and more.

Events and parties are held by student clubs and the Student Council (SC) throughout the year.

RMIT University Vietnam art collection is a collection of contemporary Vietnamese art. The Vietnamese artists in the collection range from established and mid-career artists as well as young emerging artists.  RMIT Library Vietnam.

RMIT’s students have access to the Global Exchange Program which is a short-term study commitment of one or two semesters at a partner university overseas. RMIT students have access to study experiences in over 45 countries.

People

See also 
RMIT University

References

Citations

Sources 

  – via Australasian Legal Information Institute, retrieved June 8, 2017.

External links 

RMIT University Vietnam homepage
RMIT University homepage
RMIT Alumni homepage

 
 
Engineering universities and colleges in Vietnam
Technical universities and colleges in Vietnam
Universities in Ho Chi Minh City
Universities in Hanoi